Below is the list of Cape Verdean Football Championships' top goalscorers by season, the list also includes each top goalscorers of the season by Region, in most parts, the Premier Division.

National Championships

By season

By club

Regional competitions
This section is a list of the top scorers of the season by each region, in some championships, only the Premier Division is listed.

Fogo Premier Division

Santiago South Premier Division

By season

References

Football in Cape Verde